Lawrence Coleman Kolb (June 16, 1911 – October 20, 2006) was an American psychiatrist who was the New York State Commissioner of Mental Hygiene from 1975 to 1978.

Biography
His family moved to Ireland from 1928 to 1931, and he attended Trinity College in Dublin. He returned to the United States to medical school at Johns Hopkins University in Baltimore. Following graduation, he did residency training in psychiatry and neurology, then considered one specialty, at Strong Memorial Hospital in Rochester, New York. During World War II, he went into the Navy and was stationed aboard hospital ships and then put in charge of a clinic for "battle fatigue" in Portsmouth, New Hampshire. After the Navy, Kolb worked at the National Institute of Mental Health in Bethesda, Maryland (where a collection of his papers are held)  and the Mayo Clinic in Rochester, Minnesota.
 
In 1954 Kolb was appointed chairman of the Department of Psychiatry at Columbia University Medical Center and director of the New York State Psychiatric Institute. Kolb oversaw numerous clinical and research advances during his 21-year tenure, the longest of any director. In 1975 Kolb left his posts at Columbia to become the New York State Commissioner of Mental Hygiene and correct abuses in the state system of mental health.

He died on October 20, 2006 in Orlando, Florida.

Legacy
Kolb was strongly committed to research in psychiatry. Early in his career he did a seminal study of phantom limb pain (see the reference below). Many years later he led a significant study on "battle fatigue" in Vietnam veterans, finding that post-traumatic stress disorder could cause physical signs and symptoms. The research facility at New York State Psychiatric Institute is called the Lawrence C. Kolb Research Building.

His father, Lawrence Kolb (1881–1972), was also an eminent psychiatrist. Kolb Sr. pioneered the medical approach to narcotics addiction treatment and advocated treating drug addicts as patients, not criminals.

Works
 Kolb, Lawrence C.  The Painful Phantom: Psychology, Physiology and Treatment.  Springfield, IL: Thomas, 1954.
 Kolb, Lawrence C., ed. [et al.].  Schizophrenia.  Boston: Little, Brown, 1964.
 Kolb, Lawrence C., Viola W. Bernard, and Bruce P. Dohrenwend.  Urban Challenges to Psychiatry: the Case History of a Response, by 14 Authors.  Boston: Little, Brown, 1969.
 Kolb, Lawrence C.  Modern Clinical Psychiatry.  Philadelphia: Saunders, 1977.
 Kolb, Lawrence C. and Leon Roizin.  The First Psychiatric Institute: How Research and Education Changed Practice.  Washington, DC: American Psychiatric Press, 1993.
 Kolb, Lawrence C. co-written with Javad Nurbakhsh; and Hamideh Jahangiri; Handbook of Psychiatry Volume 18 , at The Lap Lambert Academic Publishing, Germany, 2019.

References

Further reading
The Painful Phantom. Psychology, Physiology and Treatment. By Lawrence C. Kolb, M.D., Section of Psychiatry, Mayo Clinic, Rochester, Minnesota. Pp 50. 1954. Springfield, Illinois: Charles C. Thomas, Publisher. Oxford, England: Blackwell Scientific Publications.
A psychophysiological study of post traumatic stress disorder in Vietnam veterans. By EB Blanchard EB, LC Kolb, TP Pallmeyer TP, and RJ Gerardi. Psychiatric Quarterly 1982 Winter;54(4):220-9.

External links
Dr. Lawrence C. Kolb: One Student’s Recollection by Richard G. Druss, M.D. in the American Journal of Psychiatry 158:692-693, May 2001
Lawrence C. Kolb, 95, Leader in Mental Health Movement, obituary by Benedict Carey in The New York Times, Oct. 28, 2006
Lawrence Kolb, 95, Studied Stress Disorders, obituary by Stephen Miller in the New York Sun, Oct. 27, 2006
Bibliography of Lawrence C. Kolb, over 90 of his publications listed by the National Library of Medicine

1911 births
2006 deaths
Physicians from Baltimore
American psychiatrists
Columbia University faculty
Columbia Medical School faculty
Presidents of the American Psychiatric Association
State cabinet secretaries of New York (state)
State health commissioners of the United States
New York State Department of Mental Hygiene
American expatriates in Ireland